Višňové may refer to places:

Czech Republic
Višňové (Znojmo District)

Slovakia
Višňové, Nové Mesto nad Váhom District
Višňové, Revúca District
Višňové, Žilina District